Eclipta eirene is a species of beetle in the family Cerambycidae. It was described by Newman in 1841.

References

Eclipta (beetle)
Beetles described in 1841